Nancy Stephens (born July 2, 1949) is a former American actress who has starred in many films and television shows. Stephens is perhaps best known for her role as Nurse Marion Chambers in John Carpenter's horror film Halloween (1978). She reprised this role in Halloween II (1981), Halloween H20: 20 Years Later (1998) and again in Halloween Kills (2021).

Early life
Stephens was born July 2, 1949 in Rusk, Texas. Stephens attended the Connecticut College, from which she graduated in 1967.

Career
A life member of The Actors Studio, Stephens starred in the soap opera Bright Promise as Jennifer Matthews from 1969–1970; her first role in a television series. She later appeared in the soap opera Days of Our Lives as Mary Anderson in 1975.

Stephens made her film debut in 1978 in John Carpenter's classic horror Halloween, playing the supporting role of Nurse Marion Chambers, who was attacked by Michael Myers in the film's early scenes. She was cast in John Carpenter's next film in 1981, Escape from New York, and later that year, reprised her role as Marion with the sequel Halloween II, having a much more significant presence on-screen. She appeared in several films such as American Dreamer, Russkies, and D2: The Mighty Ducks, before appearing for the third time as Marion Chambers in Halloween H20: 20 Years Later, the seventh film in the franchise. In 2002 she appeared in A Time for Dancing. Stephens has made guest appearances on many sitcoms such as All in the Family, CHiPs, Cheers, Ally McBeal, and Boston Legal. She reprised the role of Marion again in David Gordon Green's 2021 sequel Halloween Kills, with her character in the rebooted continuity again being killed by Myers (as she was in H20).

Personal life
Stephens has been married to Rick Rosenthal since May 23, 1981. Stephens and Rosenthal met while filming Halloween II. They have three children, one of whom is cinematographer Noah Rosenthal.

Filmography

References

External links

1949 births
Actresses from Texas
American soap opera actresses
American television actresses
Connecticut College alumni
Living people
21st-century American women